Atikokan Water Aerodrome  is located  west northwest of Atikokan, Ontario, Canada.

See also
Atikokan Municipal Airport

References

Registered aerodromes in Rainy River District
Seaplane bases in Ontario